"Ice Cream" is a song recorded by South Korean singer Hyuna, and it was taken from her second extended play, Melting.

The song alternative also features Maboos. On the day that the song was released, 22 October 2012, it was viewed two million times. Within four days, the music video for "Ice Cream" had almost reached eight million views on YouTube. Cube Entertainment (or Play CUBE Entertainment) released the video on YouTube. On 26 October (KST), the video reached ten million views on YouTube, nine days faster than Gangnam Style, HyunA's first collaboration with PSY. There is an ongoing discussion concerning whether or not the video should have a nineteen-plus rating. The song has a "strong hiphop sound and unique rapping" from Hyuna. On 21 October 2012, the extended play Melting was leaked on a "foreign music site", a day before the EP's intended release. The song nevertheless managed to reach first place on many music websites.

Music video
The full music video was released at SBS MTV on October 21, and at YouTube on October 22, 2012. At the start of the video, PSY is "gobbling up a few ice cream cones." The song's music video also features a cameo by South Korean rapper Psy. Hyuna had previously featured in the music video for PSY's "Gangnam Style". The video featured bubbles, a tattooed man and ice cream. Four days after its release, the music video tied the record for the K-idol music video to achieve ten million views on YouTube the fastest.

Charts

Credits and personnel 
Hyuna - vocals, rap
Brave Brothers - producing, songwriting, arranger, music

References

External links
 
 

2012 singles
Korean-language songs
Hyuna songs
Cube Entertainment singles
Songs written by Brave Brothers
Gaon Digital Chart number-one singles
2012 songs